Adolph Theodore Laudenberg (June 13, 1926 – June 26, 2015), known as The Santa Strangler, was an American serial killer who murdered three women in the San Pedro neighborhood of Los Angeles and one in San Francisco during the 1970s, and is the prime suspect for another two similar murders. Despite confessing to the killings to two daughters-in-law decades apart, he was only arrested in 2002, after DNA evidence connected him to the crimes. He was convicted of one murder and sentenced to life imprisonment with the possibility of parole.

Early life
Adolph Laudenberg was born in Lexington, Kentucky in 1926, to a German immigrant butcher and his wife, who died a few years after his birth. At some point, he took up whittling unique walking canes, made from salvaged wood and manzanita shrubs, which he would either give away or sell for $10 on the street. While serving in the naval construction battalion in Trinidad, British West Indies in 1944, Laudenberg met his future wife, Annelle. He adopted her son, Steve, and the couple then moved to California permanently, after Adolph left the service. He then got a job as a security guard at a steel plant, before turning towards being a cab driver in the San Pedro area in the late 1960s.

According to neighbors, the Laudenbergs were an odd fit - Annelle worked at a dance studio, was outgoing and health conscious, while Adolph was a generous, but reclusive man who mostly kept to himself. Despite their differences, their marriage lasted 30 years before the couple separated, as Annelle, who didn't return her husband's feelings of love, outed herself as a stripper. Adolph remarried, but divorced again. At some point, he travelled for a short time to New Orleans, before returning to San Pedro.

Murders
Using his job as a cabby, Laudenberg's modus operandi consisted of picking up lonely, alcoholic or ill women who reminded him of his ex-wife, whom he would then bind, rape and strangle, either in Los Angeles or San Francisco. He was questioned by police during the initial investigations, but denied everything, and since the perpetrator left barely any clues behind, he was let off.

Proven
 Lois Petrie (43) - an alcoholic whose husband had recently died from cancer, Petrie was last seen at a San Pedro bar on Christmas, 1972. The following day, she was found strangled in her apartment's bedroom, partially nude and with signs of sexual assault.
 Catherine Medina (50) - on August 18, 1974, Medina was discovered in a local San Pedro bar by her husband, who forced her out after an argument. As the couple walked home, the drunk Catherine ran away and jumped into the van of an unidentified man, which sped off. She wasn't found until the following day, when her nude body was found beside some bushes in Harbor Lake Recreational Park.
 Anna Felch (54) - about a month after the Medina killing, on September 4, the killer struck again. Felch, who worked at a hot dog stand on Cabrillo Beach, disappeared after leaving a San Pedro bar in the dead of night, inebriated. A few hours later, a construction worker found her body a few blocks away. Felch had been sexually assaulted and thereafter, strangled to death.
 Leah Griffin (60) - a retired legal secretary and heavy drinker who had recently been diagnosed with breast cancer, Griffin was bound, raped and strangled at a residential hotel in San Francisco on March 21, 1975.

Suspected
 Irene Hind (55) - owner of a San Francisco bar on Larkin Street, named "Irene's Domar Club". A generous woman who helped the people who frequented her place, she was found raped and strangled on March 12, 1974.
 Maude Burgess (83) - a retiree who helped with the management of her San Francisco apartment building, the elderly Burgess was found raped and strangled in her apartment in November 1974. A partial fingerprint was located at the scene, but it was found to not match Laudenberg.

Arrest, trial and imprisonment
In 1975, Laudenberg confessed to his future daughter-in-law that he had killed four women, three in San Pedro and one in San Francisco, which he called his 'four sins'. The woman believed his story and told the authorities, and despite their efforts, they couldn't prove the veracity of the claims. In 2002, however, he did the same to his son's ex-wife Renee, explaining what he did in far greater detail. She notified the San Luis Obispo police, who, now armed with advances in DNA, began re-examining the cold cases. Since Laudenberg had no criminal record, they had to find a way to obtain his DNA through other means.

An undercover officer invited Adolph over some coffee in a Torrance restaurant, to which the latter agreed. After discussing various topics, and almost getting caught in the act, Laudenberg walked away without throwing out his coffee cup. The other officer then swept in and got the cup, from which DNA samples were extracted and sent for testing - they matched seminal fluid found on Lois Petrie's corpse. Armed with this evidence, authorities tracked down Laudenberg's camper van and arrested him, holding him on a $1,000,000 bail. He was charged with Petrie's murder, but denied her and the others' murders. Nonetheless, he was found guilty of the Petrie killing, and sentenced to life imprisonment.

The circumstances surrounding how the officers obtained the DNA sample raised some privacy issues, with the policemen arguing that discarded items were considered public property and therefore, no legal permission was required to get a sample. The appellate court upheld the conviction, rejecting Laudenberg's argument that the expectation was that a restaurant employee should've thrown the cup out.

See also 
 List of serial killers in the United States

External links
 Dateline NBC article with interviews from both daughters-in-law

References

1926 births
2015 deaths
20th-century American criminals
American male criminals
American people convicted of murder
American people of German descent
American rapists
American serial killers
Crimes in California
Male serial killers
People convicted of murder by California
People from Lexington, Kentucky
Prisoners sentenced to life imprisonment by California
Serial killers who died in prison custody
Violence against women in the United States